William Allan McRae Jr. (September 25, 1909 – January 27, 1973) was a United States district judge of the United States District Court for the Middle District of Florida and the United States District Court for the Southern District of Florida and was a second team All-American football player for the University of Florida.

Education and career

Born in Marianna, Florida, McRae received an Artium Baccalaureus degree from the University of Florida in 1932. He received a Bachelor of Arts degree from Oxford University in 1933. He received a Juris Doctor from the Fredric G. Levin College of Law at the University of Florida in 1933. He received a Bachelor of Letters from Oxford University in 1936. He was in private practice of law in Jacksonville, Florida from 1936 to 1940. He was a Professor of Law at the University of Florida from 1940 to 1941. He was in the United States Army Air Corps as a Colonel from 1942 to 1945. He served as an adviser to the Joint Chiefs of Staff at the June 1945 San Francisco Conference, which founded the United Nations and drafted the United Nations Charter. He was in private practice of law in Bartow, Florida from 1946 to 1961.

College football career

While attending Florida, McRae played at the guard position for coach Charlie Bachman's Florida Gators football team from 1928 to 1930. During his sophomore season in 1928, he was a standout lineman for the Gators team that finished 8–1, losing only to the Tennessee Volunteers by single point in the final game of the season. After the season, United Press named him as a second-team All-American on its 1928 All-America Team.

Federal judicial service

McRae was nominated by President John F. Kennedy on February 20, 1961, to a seat on the United States District Court for the Southern District of Florida vacated by Judge William J. Barker. He was confirmed by the United States Senate on March 3, 1961, and received his commission on March 8, 1961. He was reassigned by operation of law to the United States District Court for the Middle District of Florida on October 29, 1962, to a new seat established by 76 Stat. 247. He served as Chief Judge from 1971 to 1973. His service was terminated on January 27, 1973, due to his death.

See also

 1928 College Football All-America Team
 Florida Gators football, 1920–29
 List of federal judges appointed by John F. Kennedy
 List of Florida Gators football All-Americans
 List of Levin College of Law graduates
 List of University of Florida alumni

References

Bibliography
 Carlson, Norm, University of Florida Football Vault: The History of the Florida Gators, Whitman Publishing, LLC, Atlanta, Georgia (2007).  .
 Douchant, Mike, Encyclopedia of College Basketball, Gale Research, New York, New York (1995).  .
 Golenbock, Peter, Go Gators!  An Oral History of Florida's Pursuit of Gridiron Glory, Legends Publishing, LLC, St. Petersburg, Florida (2002).  .
 Hairston, Jack, Tales from the Gator Swamp: A Collection of the Greatest Gator Stories Ever Told, Sports Publishing, LLC, Champaign, Illinois (2002).  .
 McCarthy, Kevin M.,  Fightin' Gators: A History of University of Florida Football, Arcadia Publishing, Mount Pleasant, South Carolina (2000).  .
 McEwen, Tom, The Gators: A Story of Florida Football, The Strode Publishers, Huntsville, Alabama (1974).  .
 Nash, Noel, ed., The Gainesville Sun Presents The Greatest Moments in Florida Gators Football, Sports Publishing, Inc., Champaign, Illinois (1998).  .

External links
 

1909 births
1973 deaths
Alumni of Christ Church, Oxford
American football guards
American Rhodes Scholars
Florida Gators football players
Judges of the United States District Court for the Middle District of Florida
Judges of the United States District Court for the Southern District of Florida
United States district court judges appointed by John F. Kennedy
20th-century American judges
Fredric G. Levin College of Law alumni
University of Florida faculty
United States Army Air Forces personnel of World War II
United States Army Air Forces officers
People from Marianna, Florida
Holland & Knight partners
United States Army colonels